Autoroute 15 (also called the Décarie Expressway (English) or Autoroute Décarie (French) between the Turcot and Décarie Interchanges in Montreal and the Laurentian Autoroute (English) or Autoroute des Laurentides (French) north of Autoroute 40) is a highway in western Quebec, Canada. It was, until the extension of Autoroute 25 was opened in 2011, the only constructed north-south autoroute to go out of Montreal on both sides. A-15 begins at the end of Interstate 87 at the United States border at Saint-Bernard-de-Lacolle and extends via Montreal to Sainte-Agathe-des-Monts with an eventual continuation beyond Mont-Tremblant. The total length of A-15 is currently , including a short concurrency with Autoroute 40 (Boulevard/Autoroute Métropolitan) that connects the two main sections. This is one of the few autoroutes in Quebec that does not have any spinoff highways.

Road description

Southern section

The southern section of A-15 connects the south shore suburbs of Montreal and is also the primary trade corridor route between Montreal and New York City linking Quebec Autoroute 15 to Interstate 87 at the Canada-United States border at the Champlain-St. Bernard de Lacolle Border Crossing. This was the former Route 9, and connected with US 9 on the western shore of Lake Champlain. In Brossard, it joins up with A-10 and A-20 across the Champlain Bridge into Montreal. The A-10 splits off almost immediately after crossing the bridge to head into downtown Montreal at the Bonaventure Expressway and the A-20 splits off shortly after at the Turcot Interchange (échangeur Turcot), leaving the A-15 to continue northward as Autoroute Décarie until the Décarie Interchange (échangeur Décarie) with the A-40 at the point where it turns from the Trans-Canada into the Metropolitan Expressway.

The route is also connected to Autoroute 30 in Candiac which was completed to Autoroute 20 in 2012 providing quick access to the south shore of Montreal, to southern communities located alongside Autoroute 15 and to the Canada–US border in Lacolle. It will also give quicker access from there to areas west of Montreal and also Ottawa and Gatineau.

Décarie Autoroute 

The Décarie Autoroute is a sunken highway between the northbound and southbound lanes of Decarie Boulevard from the Metropolitan Autoroute at its northern end to Monkland Avenue and the Villa Maria Metro station at its southern end. It was built on a wide expanse of vacant land, donated to the city by the Décarie estate on the condition that a streetcar line would be established. The decommissioning of the streetcar system in 1959 left the right-of-way as an obvious choice for a highway and so the Décarie Autoroute was dug there. South of Queen Mary Road, however, were a significant number of houses that were demolished.

To avoid demolishing Notre-Dame-de-Grâce Church, the highway makes a slight westerly jog below Côte-Saint-Luc Road and runs through a short tunnel, before emerging between Addington and Botrel Streets and running down to Sherbrooke Street and Saint Jacques Street, where it spectacularly goes from being below the ground to well above the ground as it intersects with Autoroute 20 and Route 136 in the infamous Turcot Interchange (dubbed "Spaghetti Junction" by train crews operating the former CN Rail Turcot Yard). Following the conversion from streetcar line to the highway, the Décarie estate sued the city but was unable to prevail because it did not document its case well enough for the nevertheless sympathetic court.

Decarie Boulevard 

Decarie Boulevard itself continues; from Monkland Avenue south to Saint Jacques Street past the McGill University Health Centre Glen Campus superhospital; and from Autoroute 40 north into Montreal past Du College Station and Côte-Vertu Station/Norgate shopping centre to Poirier Street. Between Monkland Avenue and A 40, Decarie Boulevard serves as sort of a service road on both sides of the autoroute.

Northern section
After its concurrency with A-40, the northern section of A-15 is the main highway route to the Laurentians or Laurentides, until it downgrades to Route 117. It also links up to the northern suburbs of Montreal, as well as provides a connection to the A-440, A-640 and the A-50 in Mirabel. The first section from A-40 to Saint-Jérôme was opened on August 29, 1959 (source Montreal Star Aug. 29, 1959, page 3) as a toll road, although the tolls were removed in 1985. This section was also the first to be designed as an autoroute in the province. It was named Autoroute Montréal-Laurentides during the 1960s.

Over the next years, it was extended north to Sainte-Agathe-des-Monts as a new connection to touristic and skiing destinations in the Laurentides including in Saint-Sauveur, Sainte-Adèle and Estérel. In the future, it is possible that the A-15 may continue even farther north, past Mont-Tremblant, as Route 117 is already an at-grade expressway with a freeway bypass of Mont-Tremblant completed, and the name Autoroute des Laurentides is also recognized on the freeway bypass (and exit numbers continue). This section is numbered separately from the southern section as if it were a different route. The northern route is also part of the Trans-Canada Highway.

Exit list
Exit numbering resets at the two interchanges with Autoroute 40 in Montréal.

Disasters
On February 19, 2020, white-out conditions caused a pile-up involving more than 200 vehicles in La Prairie, a suburb of Montreal. Two persons died and more than 70 were injured.

On June 18, 2000, the southern portion of the Boulevard du Souvenir overpass in Laval (which crosses over Quebec Autoroute 15), under reconstruction, collapsed into the roadway, killing one and injuring two when cars were crushed underneath the structure. Sixteen beams weighing about  each fell. The contractor was faulted for shoddy work. The arched concrete beams were unsecured and tipped over like dominoes, many of them breaking into pieces.

The expressway has also seen flooding. The Décarie Expressway, which is below-grade, was heavily flooded and became a river. Over 300 vehicles were abandoned when they were submerged. Two people were killed by the storm. One 80-year-old man on the Expressway drowned and another one was killed by electrical wires (electrocuted). On July 5, 2005, another torrential downpour flooded portions of the Expressway after several manhole covers blew open from the storm sewers below them being overloaded.

See also 
 Decarie Boulevard
 Gibeau Orange Julep

Notes

References

External links

 A-15 at motorways-exits.com
 A-15 at Quebec Autoroutes
 Steve Anderson's MontrealRoads.com: Decarie Autoroute (A-15)
 Steve Anderson's MontrealRoads.com: Laurentian Autoroute (A-15)
 Transports Quebec Map

15
Quebec 015
Roads in Laval, Quebec
Roads in Montreal
Verdun, Quebec
Transport in Brossard
Former toll roads in Canada